"Someone Could Lose a Heart Tonight" is a song co-written and recorded by American country music artist Eddie Rabbitt.  
The song was written by Rabbitt, Even Stevens and David Malloy.

"Someone Could Lose a Heart Tonight" was released in November 1981 as the second single from the album Step by Step.  The song went to number one for one week and spent a total of twelve weeks on the country chart, becoming Rabbitt's tenth number one country single.  "Someone Could Lose a Heart Tonight" also crossed over to the Top 40 peaking at number fifteen.

Charts

Weekly charts

Year-end charts

References
 

1981 singles
1981 songs
Eddie Rabbitt songs
Songs written by David Malloy
Songs written by Eddie Rabbitt
Song recordings produced by David Malloy
Elektra Records singles
Songs written by Even Stevens (songwriter)